Aku is a larger town  in Enugu State, Nigeria. It is located in Igbo Etiti Local Government Area.
Aku is known for agriculture and cultural practices such as their Odo festival.

The town has an official Post Office.

References

Towns in Enugu State